Jossigny is a commune in the Seine-et-Marne department in the Île-de-France region in north-central France.  It is located in the Val de Bussy sector of Marne-la-Vallée. As of 2018, its population was 671.

Demographics
Inhabitants are called Jossignaciens.

School
The municipality has a single preschool and elementary school.

See also
Communes of the Seine-et-Marne department

References

External links

Official site 
1999 Land Use, from IAURIF (Institute for Urban Planning and Development of the Paris-Île-de-France région) 

Communes of Seine-et-Marne
Val de Bussy